Mahagujarat movement, known as Mahagujarat Andolan locally, was a political movement demanding the creation of the state of Gujarat for Gujarati-speaking people from the bilingual Bombay state of India in 1956. It succeeded in the formation of Gujarat, on 1 May 1960.

Etymology
The term Mahagujarat includes all Gujarati speaking area including mainland Gujarat and peninsulas of Saurashtra and Kutch. Writer-politician Kanaiyalal Munshi had coined the term Mahagujarat at the Karachi meet of Gujarati Sahitya Parishad in 1937.

Background

During British rule in India, sections of the western coast of India were the part of the Bombay Presidency. In 1937, Bombay Presidency was included as a province of British India.
After independence of India in 1947, the demand for linguistic states came up. On 17 June 1948, Rajendra Prasad set up the Linguistic Provinces Commission to recommend whether or not the states should be reorganized on a linguistic basis. The commission included S. K. Dhar (retired Judge of the Allahabad High Court), J. N. Lal (lawyer) and Panna Lall (retired Indian Civil Service officer), and so it was called Dhar commission. In its 10 December 1948 report, the Commission recommended that "the formation of provinces on exclusively or even mainly linguistic considerations is not in the larger interests of the Indian nation".

The Mahagujarat conference was held in 1948 to include all Gujarati speaking people under one administration which finally resulted in formation of Gujarat.

According to the autobiography of Indulal Yagnik, Bombay state chief minister B. G. Kher and the then home minister Morarji Desai visited Dang in May, 1949. B. G. Kher stated that tribal people of Dang spoke Marathi and focus should be on that. Indulal Yagnik and others visited Dang to examine this. Gujarati Sabha also sent a committee for examination and agitate on negligence by government. The committee reported that Dang is more related to Gujarat.

By 1952, the demand for separate Telugu-majority Andhra State had started in Madras State. Potti Sreeramulu, one of the activists demanding Andhra State, died on 16 December 1952 after undertaking a fast-unto-death. Subsequently, Andhra State was formed in 1953. This sparked agitations all over the country demanding linguistic states.

In December 1953, Prime Minister Jawaharlal Nehru appointed the States Reorganisation Commission (SRC) to prepare report on the creation of linguistic states. The commission was headed by Justice Fazal Ali so it was called Fazal Ali Commission. The commission reported in 1955 to reorganise states of India.

Agitation
SRC considered to form states on linguistic basis but recommended that Bombay state should stay as a bilingual state. It was further enlarged by the addition of Saurashtra State and Kutch State, the Marathi-speaking districts of Nagpur Division of Madhya Pradesh, and the Marathawada region of Hyderabad. The southernmost districts of Bombay state were included in Mysore State. So it had Gujarati-speaking population in north and Marathi-speaking population in southern parts.

Both Gujarati and Marathi people opposed the SRC's recommendation and strongly demanded separate linguistic states. The situation became complicated because both of them wanted to include Bombay city (now Mumbai) in their own states due to its economic and cosmopolitan values. Jawaharlal Nehru also suggested to form three states; Maharashtra, Gujarat and centrally governed city-state of Bombay to solve conflict.

Protest broke out in Bombay and other Marathi-speaking districts later known as Samyukta Maharashtra Movement demanding separate Marathi state. Morarji Desai, then the Chief Minister of Bombay State, was against it. On 8 August 1956, some college students of Ahmedabad went to local Congress House near Lal Darwaza to demand separate state. Morarji Desai did not listen to them and police repression resulted in death of five to eight students. It triggered massive protests across the state. Indulal Yagnik came out of his retirement from politics and founded Mahagujarat Janata Parishad to guide movement. Many protesters including Indulal Yagnik and Dinkar Mehta, Dhanvant Shroff were arrested and kept at Gaekwad Haveli in Ahmedabad for a few days and later imprisoned in Sabarmati Central Jail for three and half months. Protest also spread in other parts of the state which forced Morarji Desai to go on week-long fast. People did not turn up to support him during fast and stayed in home following self-imposed curfew, Janata Curfew. Just before the declaration of carving three states as Nehru suggested, 180 members of Parliament suggested return to bilingual Bombay state together. There was conflict over Mumbai and Dang which was solved through discussions. Gandhian activist Ghelubhai Nayak actively lobbied for accession of Dang in Gujarat. Mumbai went to Maharashtra and Dang went to Gujarat. Mahagujarat seema samiti leader was Purshottamdas Thakurdas.

Result
President Rajendra Prasad, Vice-President Sarvapalli Radhakrishnan and Prime Minister Jawaharlal Nehru finally agreed upon the formation of two new lingual states after prolonged agitation. On 1 May 1960, two new states, Gujarat and Maharashtra, were created. Mahagujarat Janata Parishad was dissolved on success of movement. The first government was formed under Jivraj Mehta who become the first Chief Minister of Gujarat.

Monuments

 Shahid Smarak or Khambhi (Martyr Monument) is erected near Lal Darwaja AMTS Bus Stop, Bhadra, Ahmedabad; in memory of college students who went to local Congress House to demand separate state during movement and died in police firing. It has a statue of a young holding torch in hand. So it was called Khambhi Satyagrah (Monument Movement) earlier.
 Statue of Indulal Yagnik was erected in a small garden at east end of Nehru Bridge, Ahmedabad and the garden is named after him.

Participants

Notable individuals who participated in the movement include:
Indulal Yagnik, the movement's leader
Sanat Mehta
Satyam Patel
Dinkar Mehta
Vidyagauri Nilkanth
Sharda Mehta
Ashok Bhatt
Budhdhiben Dhuv
Ravishankar Maharaj
Brahmkumar Bhatt
Prabodh Raval
Harihar Khambholja
Dinkar Amin
Ramniklal Maniyar
Ranjitrai Shastri
Markand Shastri
Jayanti Dalal

Popular culture
Several leaders associated with the movement were writers, poets and even film-makers. Maya, a novel by Indulal Yagnik is set during movement. Jayanti Dalal,  Yashwant Shukla, Vinodini Nilkanth, Ishwar Petlikar, Ushnas had also used movement as their inspiration for literary works. Midnight's Children, a classic by Salman Rushdie, which won the Booker Prize has a backdrop of both the Mahagujarat movement as well as Samyukta Maharashtra movement.

See also
Indulal Yagnik
Navnirman Andolan
Samyukta Maharashtra Movement
Hutatma Chowk

References

Further reading

1956 in India
History of Gujarat (1947–present)
Reorganisation of Indian states
Protests in India
Regionalism in India